Lonesome Road is the title of a recording by Doc Watson and Merle Watson, released in 1977.

Lonesome Road is out-of-print and was re-issued on CD in 1998 by BGO Records. It was also released in 2002 by Southern Music packaged with Look Away!.

Reception

Writing for Allmusic, music critic Jim  Worbois wrote of the album "Doc does the country blues as well as anything else he does and this record is filled with some fine performances."

Track listing
 "I Recall a Gypsy Woman" (Bob McDill, Allen Reynolds) – 3:49
 "Minglewood Blues" (Noah Lewis) – 2:58
 "Mean Mama Blues" (Ernest Tubb) – 2:51
 "Look up Look Down That Lonesome Road" (Traditional) – 4:02
 "My Creole Belle" (J. Bodewalt Lampe) – 2:42
 "Blue Railroad Train" (Alton Delmore) – 2:18
 "Ain't Nobody's Fault But Mine" (Traditional) – 2:45
 "Stone Wall (Around My Heart)" (Pat Twitty) – 3:26
 "I Ain't Going Honky-Tonkn' Anymore" (Ernest Tubb) – 3:02
 "Broomstraw Philosophers and Scuppernong Wine" (Larry John Wilson) – 3:17

Personnel
Doc Watson – vocals, guitar, harmonica
Merle Watson – guitar, dobro, slide guitar
T. Michael Coleman – bass
Bob Wilson – piano
Karl Himmel – drums, percussion

References

1977 albums
Doc Watson albums
United Artists Records albums
Albums recorded at Studio in the Country